John Thomas Berger (October 22, 1923 – June 30, 2004) was an American film and television actor. He mostly appeared on western television shows including, Gunsmoke, Bonanza, Rawhide, Wanted: Dead or Alive, Trackdown, Laramie, Death Valley Days, Tales of Wells Fargo, Maverick, Zane Grey Theatre and The Rifleman.

Early life 
Alcaide was born in Youngstown, Ohio. as John Thomas Berger. He was the son of George F. B. Berger and Frances Conroy. He moved to Hollywood in 1942 and worked as a bouncer at the Hollywood Palladium.

Alcaide served in the U.S. Army from 1943 to 1946 during World War II. After the war, he returned to the Hollywood Palladium and joined the Ben Bard Players, in 1948.

Career 
In 1958, Alcaide was the original choice of star as the lead role in Black Saddle, but studio executives thought he was too associated with badman roles and chose Peter Breck for the lead role. During filming pilot, Alcaide injured his back in a fall and again caused permanent damage.

From 1972 to 1985, Alcaide ran a photography studio named "Peri's Pictures" in Los Angeles, California with his wife, Peri.

Death 
Alcaide died of cancer on June 30, 2004 at Palm Springs, California, at the age of 80.

Filmography

Film

Television

References

External links 

Rotten Tomatoes profile

1923 births
2004 deaths
20th-century American male actors
American male film actors
American male television actors
Burials at Desert Memorial Park
Deaths from cancer in California
Golden Boot Awards recipients
Male actors from Youngstown, Ohio
United States Army personnel of World War II
Western (genre) television actors